Qutub Festival is a five-day festival usually held in November–December in the Qutub complex in the Indian metropolis of Delhi organized by Delhi Tourism, Govt. of Delhi. The festival showcases the cultural art forms of the country but also puts this classic structure of Qutub Minar in the cynosure of national and international attention. This year's festival will be held from 15-19 November, 2019.

Several reputed singers performed in the festival so far.

References

External links

Qutub Festival, Delhi at Delhi Tourism website
 It's Sufi and rock at Qutub Fest. The Hindu

 
Festivals in Delhi
Mehrauli
Cultural festivals in India
Hindustani classical music festivals
Fairs in Delhi
Islamic music festivals